Rumiñawi, born late 15th century in present-day Ecuador, died June 25, 1535, was a general during the Inca Civil War. Hispanicized spellings of his name include Rumiaoui, Ruminavi, Ruminagui, Rumiñagui, Rumiñahui. After the death of  Emperor Atahualpa, he led the resistance in 1533 against the Spanish in the northern part of the Inca Empire (modern-day Ecuador). According to tradition, he ordered the city's treasure to be hidden and the city burned to prevent looting by the Spaniards. Although captured and tortured, he never revealed the treasure. Since 1985, December 1 is celebrated as a day of commemoration of his acts.

Life
Born in Pillaro in modern Tungurahua Province in Ecuador, his given name was Ati II Pillahuaso. Inca historians tend to believe that he was Atahualpa's half-brother, born from a native noble woman. 

Later in life, after becoming an important warrior and military leader, he was called Rumiñawi (Kichwa rumi meaning stone, rock, ñawi meaning eye, face, "stone eye", "stone face", "rock eye" or "rock face",

When Francisco Pizarro imprisoned Atahualpa and held him in the Ransom Room, Rumiñawi took forces to Cajamarca to deliver a huge amount of gold for his release. 

After the Spaniards executed Atahualpa, Rumiñahui returned to Quito.  He is believed to have ordered the Treasure of the Llanganatis thrown into a lake or buried in snow.

Sebastián de Benalcázar headed to Quito, intent on any treasure he could recover. The forces of Rumiñawi and Benalcázar met at the Battle of Mount Chimborazo, where Rumiñawi was defeated. However, before the Spanish forces captured Quito, its treasures were secreted away.

To prevent the Spanish soldiers from looting the city, Rumiñawi had ordered it to be burned. He also ordered the principal ladies of the temples who refused to flee, to be killed, to prevent their being captured and assaulted by the foreign soldiers. Rumiñahui was eventually captured by the Spanish, who tortured and killed him. But he never revealed the location of the treasure.

Legacy
In 1985 the Ecuadorian Congress made December 1st an annual day of remembrance for Rumiñawi, as an indigenous hero and defender of the Kingdom of Quito.
Rumiñahui's portrait was the prominent image on the front of the 1,000 Ecuadorian sucre note.

References

Further reading
Moya Espinoza, Reynaldo. La conquista en Piura.

15th-century births
1535 deaths
History of Ecuador
Inca Empire people
Indigenous military personnel of the Americas